The 2013 Major League Baseball postseason was the playoff tournament of Major League Baseball for the 2013 season. The winners of the League Division Series would move on to the League Championship Series to determine the pennant winners that face each other in the World Series.

In the American League, the Detroit Tigers made their third straight appearance, the Boston Red Sox returned for the first time since 2009, the Oakland Athletics made their second straight appearance, the Tampa Bay Rays made their fourth appearance in the past six years, and the Cleveland Indians returned for the first time since 2007.

In the National League, the St. Louis Cardinals made their third straight postseason appearance, and the Atlanta Braves and Cincinnati Reds made their second straight appearances. The Pittsburgh Pirates ended over two decades of futility, as they clinched their first postseason berth since 1992, and the Los Angeles Dodgers made their first postseason appearance of the decade. 2013 marked the first of what is now currently ten straight postseason appearances for the Dodgers, who currently hold the longest active postseason streak in the majors.

The postseason began on October 1, 2013, and ended on October 30, 2013, with the Red Sox defeating the Cardinals in six games in the 2013 World Series. It was the eighth title for the Red Sox.

Playoff seeds
The following teams qualified for the postseason:

American League
 Boston Red Sox - 97–65, Clinched AL East
 Oakland Athletics - 96–66, Clinched AL West
 Detroit Tigers - 93–69, Clinched AL Central
 Cleveland Indians - 92–70
 Tampa Bay Rays - 92–71

National League
 St. Louis Cardinals - 97–65, Clinched NL Central
 Atlanta Braves - 96–66, Clinched NL East
 Los Angeles Dodgers - 92–70, Clinched NL West
 Pittsburgh Pirates - 94–68
 Cincinnati Reds - 90–72

Playoff bracket

American League Wild Card

(4) Cleveland Indians vs. (5) Tampa Bay Rays 

The Rays defeated the Indians in a 4–0 shutout to return to the ALDS. The Indians became the first team in MLB history to be eliminated from the postseason without scoring a run.

The Indians would not return to the postseason again until 2016. Both teams would meet again in the Wild Card round in 2022, which was won by Cleveland in a sweep.

National League Wild Card

(4) Pittsburgh Pirates vs. (5) Cincinnati Reds 

This was the sixth postseason meeting between the Pirates and Reds (the others being in the NLCS in 1970, 1972, 1975, 1979, and 1990). The Pirates defeated the Reds 6–2 to advance to the NLDS. It was the first postseason win by the Pirates since the 1979 World Series.

American League Division Series

(1) Boston Red Sox vs. (5) Tampa Bay Rays 

This was the second postseason meeting between the Rays and Red Sox. They last met in the 2008 ALCS, which the Rays won in seven games. The Red Sox defeated the Rays in four games to return to the ALCS for the first time since 2008.

The Red Sox controlled the tempo of the first two games - they blew out the Rays in Game 1, and won Game 2 by three runs to go up 2-0 in the series headed to Tampa. The Rays narrowly won Game 3 to avoid a sweep, but the Red Sox ultimately closed out the series with a 3-1 victory in Game 4.

The Rays would not return to the postseason again until 2019.

(2) Oakland Athletics vs. (3) Detroit Tigers 

This was the fourth postseason meeting between the Athletics and Tigers. The Tigers overcame a 2–1 series deficit to defeat the Athletics in five games once again, and returned to the ALCS for the third year in a row.

The Tigers held off a late rally by the Athletics to steal Game 1 on the road. Game 2 remained scoreless until the bottom of the ninth when Oakland's Stephen Vogt drove in Yoenis Céspedes with a walk-off base hit single to even the series headed to Detroit. The Athletics scored six runs off 2013 AL ERA leader Aníbal Sánchez to go up 2-1 in the series, and were one win away from returning to the ALCS. Game 4 was an offensive duel - the Athletics lead 3-0 going into the fifth, until Detroit's Jhonny Peralta tied the game with a three-run home run. Coco Crisp regained the lead for the Athletics in the top of the seventh by driving in Stephen Vogt with an RBI single. In the bottom of the inning, Austin Jackson put the Tigers in the lead for good with a broken-bat RBI single, which scored Andy Dirks. The Tigers scored three more runs in the bottom of the eighth, and then held off a late rally by the Athletics to force a series-deciding Game 5 in Oakland. The Tigers would shut out the Athletics in Game 5 thanks to a solid pitching performance from Justin Verlander to advance to the ALCS.

With the win, the Tigers improved their postseason record against the Athletics to 3-1 all time. As of 2022, this is the last playoff series win by a team from Detroit.

National League Division Series

(1) St. Louis Cardinals vs. (4) Pittsburgh Pirates 

The Cardinals defeated the Pirates in five games to advance to the NLCS for the third year in a row. In St. Louis, both teams exchanged blowout wins in Games 1 and 2. When the series moved to Pittsburgh, the Pirates won by a 5-3 score to be one win away from their first NLCS appearance in 21 years. However, the Cardinals would narrowly take Game 4 to send the series back to St. Louis, where the Cardinals won by a 6-1 score to advance.

This is the last postseason appearance outside of the Wild Card round for the Pirates.

(2) Atlanta Braves vs. (3) Los Angeles Dodgers 

This was the second postseason meeting between the Dodgers and Braves. They previously met in the 1996 NLDS, which the Braves won in a sweep. The Dodgers defeated the Braves in four games to advance to the NLCS for the first time since 2009. This was the last postseason series ever played at Turner Field.

American League Championship Series

(1) Boston Red Sox vs. (3) Detroit Tigers 

The Red Sox defeated the Tigers in six games to return to the World Series for the first time since 2007, capped off by two Grand Slams by David Ortiz and Shane Victorino in Games 2 and 6 respectively.

In Boston, the Tigers took Game 1 in a 1-0 shutout despite having a no-hit bid broken up in the bottom of the ninth inning. In Game 2, the Tigers held a 5-1 lead after the top of the eighth inning, however, the Red Sox loaded the bases, and David Ortiz hit a grand slam to tie the game. The Red Sox won the game in the bottom of the ninth to even the series. In Detroit for Game 3, the Red Sox prevailed in a 1-0 shutout to take the series lead. The Tigers responded with a 7-3 win in Game 4 to even the series at two. In Game 5, the Red Sox fended off a late Tigers rally to win 4-3, and regain the series lead headed back to Boston. In Game 6, the Tigers held a 2-1 lead going into the bottom of the seventh until the Red Sox again loaded the bases. Then, Shane Victorino hit a grand slam to put the Red Sox in the lead for good, securing the pennant. 

This would be the last ALCS appearance by the Tigers as of 2022. The Red Sox would win their next AL pennant in 2018, against the Houston Astros in five games en route to winning the World Series.

National League Championship Series

(1) St. Louis Cardinals vs. (3) Los Angeles Dodgers 

This was the fourth postseason meeting between the Dodgers and Cardinals. The Cardinals won in six games, advancing to the World Series for the second time in three years.

The Cardinals took Game 1 after 13 innings, and then shut out the Cardinals in Game 2, 1-0, to go up 2-0 in the series headed to Los Angeles. Hyun-jin Ryu helped the Dodgers avoid a sweep with a 3-0 shutout victory in Game 3, but the Cardinals took a 3-1 series lead with a 4-2 win in Game 4. The Dodgers prevailed in Game 5 by two runs thanks to a solid pitching performance from Zack Greinke to send the series back to St. Louis. The Cardinals blew out the Dodgers in Game 6, as Cardinals' pitcher Michael Wacha recorded a 0.00 ERA in his two starts in the series, and was named series NLCS MVP as a result.

As of 2022, this is the last time the Cardinals won the NL pennant.

2013 World Series

(AL1) Boston Red Sox vs. (NL1) St. Louis Cardinals 

This was the fourth World Series meeting between the Cardinals and Red Sox, they had previously met in 1946, 1967, and 2004, with the Cardinals winning the former two and the Red Sox taking the latter series. It was also the first World Series since 1999 to feature both #1 seeds from the AL and NL. The Red Sox defeated the Cardinals in six games to win their eighth World Series title in franchise history. It marked the first time that the Red Sox had won the World Series at home since 1918, which is, ironically, the year when the Curse of the Bambino started.

In Boston, the Red Sox blew out the Cardinals in Game 1, while the Cardinals took Game 2 by two runs to even the series. In St. Louis, the Cardinals went up 2-1 in the series with a one-run win in Game 3. The Red Sox evened the series with a 4-2 victory in Game 4, and took Game 5 thanks to solid pitching performance from Jon Lester to go up 3-2 in the series headed back to Boston. The Red Sox closed out the series with a 6-1 win in Game 6, winning their first home World Series since 1918.

With the win, the World Series history between these two teams is tied at two series wins each.

As of 2022, this is the last World Series appearance by the Cardinals. The Red Sox would return to the World Series again in 2018, defeating the Los Angeles Dodgers in five games.

References

External links
 League Baseball Standings & Expanded Standings - 2013

 
Major League Baseball postseason